Lewis Arthur Wyld (15 July 1905 – 16 February 1974) was a British track cyclist who was born in Tibshelf, Derbyshire, he won a bronze medal at the 1928 Summer Olympics.

On 5 August 1928 in Amsterdam, Lew Wyld, along with Frank Southall, Percy Wyld and Harry Wyld, broke the Team Pursuit Olympic Record in a time of 5:01.6, beating the previous record by 9.2 seconds. They were only the third team to hold the record since it first began on 10 August 1920, it was broken by 10.2 seconds the next day before standing for nearly 8 years. It is likely the record was broken in the quarter or semi-final round, as they only won a bronze medal, and as they would have proceeded to the finals had the record been broken in the qualifying rounds.

References

1905 births
1974 deaths
English male cyclists
Olympic bronze medallists for Great Britain
Olympic cyclists of Great Britain
Cyclists at the 1928 Summer Olympics
People from the London Borough of Lambeth
Olympic medalists in cycling
Medalists at the 1928 Summer Olympics